The 1996 Team Ice Racing World Championship was the 18th edition of the Team World Championship. The final was held on ?, 1996, in Izhevsk, in Russia. Russia won the title.

Final Classification

See also 
 1996 Individual Ice Speedway World Championship
 1996 Speedway World Team Cup in classic speedway
 1996 Speedway Grand Prix in classic speedway

References 

Ice speedway competitions
World